Hans Rudi Erdt (31 March 1883 – 24 May 1918)  was a German graphic designer, lithographer and commercial artist known for his contributions to the Sachplakat movement created by Lucian Bernhard. His work at the prestigious Hollerbaum und Schmidt art printing company along with Edmund Edel, Hans Lindenstadt, Julius Klinger, Julius Gipkens, Paul Scheurich and Karl Schulpig make him one of the most important representatives of German poster art between 1906 and 1918. Erdt has also been recognized for his innovative use of typography in posters.

Life and work
Born in Benediktbeuern, Bavaria, he trained as a lithographer and became a student of Maximilian Dasio at the Munich School of Applied Arts. He joined Hollerbaum und Schmidt around 1908, becoming part of the "Berlin School", where he created what is considered one of the most enduring examples of Sachplakat, an advertisement for the nascent racing division of the Opel car manufacturer. During World War I he created propaganda posters for the German State Film Committee, as well as promotional posters for propaganda films, some of which, like U Boote Heraus! became quite famous at the time.

Erdt died in Berlin of tuberculosis at the age of 35.

Gallery

Advertisements

World War I film propaganda posters

Notes

Bibliography

External links
 Ausstellungskatalog DHM: Kunst! Kommerz! Visionen! - Exhibition website (in German)
 World Catalog publications
 Erdt, Hans Rudi Digitized poster collection at the Library of Congress

German lithographers
German poster artists
People from the Kingdom of Bavaria
1883 births
1918 deaths
German graphic designers
20th-century deaths from tuberculosis
Tuberculosis deaths in Germany